The 2016–17 Navy Midshipmen women's basketball team represented the United States Naval Academy during the 2016–17 NCAA Division I women's basketball season. The Midshipmen, led by ninth year head coach Stefanie Pemper, played their home games at Alumni Hall and were members of the Patriot League. They advanced to the championship of the Patriot League women's tournament where they lost to Bucknell. They received an automatic bid to the Women's National Invitation Tournament they defeated George Washington in the first round before losing to Virginia Tech in the second round.

Roster

Schedule

|-
!colspan=9 style="background:#00005D; color:white;"| Non-conference regular season

|-
!colspan=9 style="background:#00005D; color:white;"| Patriot League regular season

|-
!colspan=9 style="background:#00005D; color:white;"| Patriot League Women's Tournament

|-
!colspan=9 style="background:#00005D; color:white;"| WNIT

See also
2016–17 Navy Midshipmen men's basketball team

References

Navy
Navy Midshipmen women's basketball seasons
2017 Women's National Invitation Tournament participants
Navy
Navy